Valhalla High School is a public high school located in Valhalla, New York. The school serves about 500 students in grades 9 to 12 in the Valhalla Union Free School District.

Distinctions

Valhalla High School is a National Blue Ribbon School under the National Blue Ribbon Schools Program of the U.S. Department of Education.

College acceptances for the recent Valhalla High School graduating classes include Binghamton University, Boston College, Boston University, Bucknell University, Columbia University, Cornell University, Dartmouth College, Drexel University, Duke University, George Washington University, McGill University, Johns Hopkins University, New York University, Northeastern University, Rensselaer Polytechnic Institute, Rutgers University, Stony Brook University, University of Hartford, University of Miami, University of Michigan, University of Notre Dame, University of Texas-Austin, The United States Military Academy at West Point, Villanova University and the University of Wisconsin-Madison

Athletics and student clubs

Athletics at Valhalla High School include Basketball, Football, Tennis, Soccer, Volleyball, Wrestling, Track and Baseball.
The Valhalla Vikings' championship titles include the 1996 New York State Football Championship, the 2010 New York State Baseball Championship and the 2019 New York State Volleyball Championship.

Valhalla High School offers various student clubs, including the Academic Challenge Club, the Book Club, the Debate Club, the Environmental Club, the Human Rights Club, the National Honor Society and the World Language Honor Society.  Valhalla's very popular Drama Society produces an annual fall drama and spring musical.  Recent productions include The Crucible, It's a Wonderful Life and Twelve Angry Jurors.

Notable alumni
 Keefe Cato (class of 1976), professional baseball player
 Kevin Meaney (class of 1974), stand-up comedian and actor, who starred in the movie "Big" with Tom Hanks and appeared on The Tonight Show, Late Night with David Letterman, Live! with Regis and Kathie Lee, The Oprah Winfrey Show and Conan.
 Frank Pace (class of 1968), TV producer and writer, with more than 700 episodes of network television to his credit (including Suddenly Susan and Murphy Brown).
 Keith St. John (class of 1975), lawyer and politician, who is the first openly gay African American elected to public office in the United States.

References

External links
 

Educational institutions established in 1953
Public high schools in Westchester County, New York
1953 establishments in New York (state)